Phosphatase and actin regulator 3 is an enzyme that in humans is encoded by the PHACTR3 gene.

Function 

The protein encoded by this gene is associated with the nuclear scaffold in proliferating cells. It was found to bind to the catalytic subunit of protein phosphatase-1 (PP1) and inhibit PP1 activity, suggesting that this protein may function as a regulatory subunit of PP1. Alternative splicing at this locus results in several transcript variants encoding different isoforms.

Interactions 
PHACTR3 has been shown to interact with PPP1CA.

References

Further reading